The New Zealand cricket team, the Black Caps, played a controversial tour of Zimbabwe in August and September 2005, including some warm-up matches in Namibia.  They played 2 Test matches against Zimbabwe and also participated in a triangular Limited Overs International competition with Zimbabwe and India.

Political debate
Concern for human rights violations in Zimbabwe, in particular the slum clearances known as Operation Murambatsvina, prompted calls by the Green Party and human rights advocates including Amnesty International for the cricket team to boycott the tour. The New Zealand Government made it clear that the scheduled return visit of the Zimbabwean cricket team to New Zealand in December 2005 would not occur as entry to New Zealand would be denied to the Zimbabwean players.

The Black Caps were obliged to tour by the International Cricket Council, and faced a fine of over NZ$3 million if they did not tour. The ICC was asked to waive this fine but refused. It was also claimed that withdrawal from the tour would greatly harm New Zealand's chances of co-hosting the 2011 Cricket World Cup with a potential loss of $NZ20 million. Two opinion polls showed a majority of New Zealanders opposed the tour. The TVNZ/Colmar Brunton poll taken on 30 June found 77 percent opposed, and a Fairfax New Zealand/ACNielsen poll on 18 July showed 53 percent opposed, (NZ Herald). Parliament voted with a substantial majority on 26 July to ask the Black Caps to abandon the tour. Only ACT and the Māori Party voted against the resolution.

The two Tests against Zimbabwe were being followed by a tri-nations One Day International series, with India making up the threesome.

Schedule (Zimbabwe leg)

 4 August : Practice match in Harare
 7 August: First Test starts (Harare)
 15 August: Second Test starts (Bulawayo)
 24 August: 1st ODI New Zealand v Zimbabwe (Bulawayo)
 26 August: 2nd ODI India v New Zealand (Bulawayo)
 29 August: 3rd ODI Zimbabwe v India (Harare)
 31 August: 4th ODI New Zealand v Zimbabwe (Harare)
 2 September: 5th ODI New Zealand v India (Harare)
 4 September: 6th ODI Zimbabwe v India (Harare)
 6 September: Final (Harare)

Results

Matches against Namibia

Namibia v New Zealand, 30 July 

New Zealand won by 29 runs. Craig Cumming made 116 to lift the tourists to 330 for 6 in their first match at Windhoek against Namibia, a team coming off a disappointing ICC Trophy tournament, where they finished seventh and did not qualify for the 2007 World Cup. In reply, Namibia crashed to 75 for 5, but recovered to 301 all out, despite economical bowling from fast bowler Shane Bond who was returning from injury and took two for 20 in 10 overs. Cricinfo scorecard

Namibia v New Zealand, 31 July

New Zealand won by 148 runs. The Black Caps batted first again and made 326 for 5. Brendon McCullum scored 84 not out and Nathan Astle an unbeaten 73, to help amass a fine 50 over total. This time, though, the Namibians weren't allowed to get away to a high score, as Shane Bond and Chris Martin took two wickets each and helped them collapse to 178. Daniel Vettori polished off the tail with three for 24. Cricinfo scorecard

Test series

First Test 

New Zealand ran out easy winners in the First Test, winning inside two days by such a margin that it again called the Zimbabweans Test status into question. After the Zimbabwean seamers made early inroads to surprise both the New Zealand batsmen and neutral spectators, New Zealand got the match into their groove. Heath Streak, making his return to international cricket after a one-year self-imposed exile following a dispute with the national selectors, bowled well without much reward, while from the other end Blessing Mahwire removed both openers with three balls, as New Zealand wobbled to 24 for 2. Stephen Fleming and Hamish Marshall rebuilt quickly, punishing Streak in particular, and runs flowed - until Hamish Marshall was lbw to Chris Mpofu with a good in-cutter. New Zealand survived to lunch, but then Nathan Astle and Scott Styris fell, and suddenly the score was 113 for 5.

From there, the situation deteriorated for Zimbabwe. Chris Mpofu injured his leg and had to go off the field, leaving only three bowlers, whom Brendon McCullum and Daniel Vettori attacked with venom. Both reached their centuries in less than 100 balls, Vettori smacking twenty fours and two sixes in his 127 before finally being bowled by Streak. Vettori had enjoyed a slice of luck - having inside edged onto his leg stump, the bail refused to fall down, and Vettori made a further 60. By the time he was out, the score had exploded to 432 for 9 - helped by Shane Bond's blitzing 41. At stumps on day one, New Zealand were 452 for 9, and comfortably back in the drivers' seat, as Zimbabwe were left to rue all the poor deliveries in the evening session - which had yielded 213 runs.

James Franklin and Chris Martin led the NZ attack, taking three wickets each for almost no runs at all, as the Zimbabwean's were dismissed for a dismal 59, with only Taylor (10) and Carlisle (20 not out) and extras (14) making double figures.  Five players, including all-rounder Streak failed to score. Forced to follow on, the home side managed 99 in nearly 50 overs. Hamilton Masakadza's 42 was the sole highlight, while nine batsmen were dismissed in single figures, and Vettori enjoyed a cheap four for 28.

Second Test 

New Zealand ran out comfortable winners yet again, but at least Zimbabwe put up some kind of fight with the bat, passing 200 in both innings. Tatenda Taibu, the Zimbabwean captain, won the toss and chose to bat - and immediately saw the full fury of fast bowler Shane Bond, whose inswingers took care of Dion Ebrahim for 0 and Stuart Carlisle for 1.  Bond got a wicket in each of his first three overs, also dismissing Hamilton Masakadza without scoring. Zimbabwe had made seven runs for three wickets, and looked to fade to another sub-100 score.

However, Brendan Taylor wanted to repair his dire first Test. After a good partnership with Craig Wishart, the score stood at 74 for 4, and Taylor was there with Tatenda Taibu - however, he went for an overly aggressive cut shot, and Shane Bond got his fourth wicket of the morning session. He got another with the next ball, and by lunch, Zimbabwe were 75 for 6. Taibu, however, recorded his highest innings as captain against anyone except Bangladesh, and his partnership with Blessing Mahwire turned things from total despair to slight hope. Zimbabwe were eventually all out for 231, Daniel Vettori finishing off with the last two wickets after having bowled 27 of 79 overs in the innings.

Zimbabwe got a good start by dismissing both Marshall twins, James and Hamish, in successive overs. Hamish's dismissal concluded the day, but Zimbabwe would be hopeful before the second day started. That hope quickly turned to despair. Twenty-eight overs were bowled before lunch, but Zimbabwe failed to take a single wicket, and New Zealand moved into a comfortable position at 180 for 2. New Zealand could push on the accelerator, Nathan Astle getting 128 and Lou Vincent 92, as New Zealand amassed 406 runs on the second day. Graeme Cremer, the leg spinner, bowled 24 overs for 111 runs, to illustrate the Zimbabweans' predicament. Test debutant Keith Dabengwa got two for 87, however, suggesting that he might be a better choice than Cremer for the spinner place in the Zimbabwean team.

Having been bowled out in 11 overs on the third morning, New Zealand went out into the field with a lead of 253 runs. And the second Zimbabwean innings proceeded in much the same way as the first - Bond dismissing Ebrahim early, Brendan Taylor and Tatenda Taibu staging a recovery, before Blessing Mahwire staged fireworks towards the end. Three of the wickets came as run outs, the last one with Chris Mpofu running back towards Mahwire, who was concentrating on celebrating his half-century. This had evidently not registered with Mpofu, and before he realised his mistake, the stumps at his end were down. Following the match, Zimbabwe's coach Phil Simmons was sacked and replaced with former Zimbabwean international and Zimbabwe A coach Kevin Curran.

One-day internationals
Please see Videocon Tri-Series 2005 for a full treatment of the one-day international matches with Zimbabwe and India.

Notes

References

External links
 Tour home at ESPNcricinfo
 
 Black Caps start tour with win over Namibia, 1 August 2005, retrieved 2 August
 Black Caps thrash Namibia in 2nd match, 1 August 2005, retrieved 2 August
 Curran to take over as Zim coach, 17 August 2005, retrieved 18 August
 Scorecards linked to within text
 Curran confirmed as Zimbabwe coach, Reuters, 18 August 2005

2005 in New Zealand cricket
2005 in Zimbabwean cricket
International cricket competitions in 2005
2005
Zimbabwean cricket seasons from 2000–01
Cricket controversies